141 Speedway (formerly Super 141 Speedway) is a dirt racing track located between Maribel and Francis Creek, Wisconsin. The track is -mile and hosts a weekly racing program with numerous International Motor Contest Association classes.

History
The land for 141 was acquired in 1959 by original owner Dick Grall; the track was built and the then-Super 141 Speedway opened in 1960.
Grall operated the track until 1975 and leased the track until 1990, when a promoter reneged on two years' worth of leasing agreements, closing the track while litigation played out. Grall lost the desire to lease the track, but Matt Rowe bought the track from Grall in late 1997 and re-opened the track for the 1998 season.

The track was originally an asphalt oval, but management made the decision to convert to a dirt track before the 2010 season. The resulting dirt track was -mile, as the asphalt track was -mile. After the 2013 season, previous owners Bruce and Renee Conard sold the track to Scott Ratajczak, local racer Dan Ratajczak, and Iowa dirt racing promoter Toby Kruse.

In 2017, the track sued Manitowoc County over parking on a parcel of land across the road from the track; the parcel was later rezoned by a county board to allow parking.

Events

141 hosts a series of "The Creek" events: The Clash at the Creek, described as a crown jewel IMCA Modified race; the King at the Creek, an IMCA Stock Car event, and the Captain of the Creek, an IMCA Sport Mod event. The track has also hosted the IRA Sprints, and has also been a national championship venue for INEX dirt oval legends cars. In 2018, the Lucas Oil Late Model Dirt Series visited the track.

The track held a Mid-American Stock Car Series date in the 2000s.

Sanctioning
The Eastern Wisconsin Racing Association sanctioned the track from 1971 until 1978, and the track entered into a sanctioning agreement with the International Motor Contest Association in 1986. It lost IMCA sanctioning in 2011 when a change to Saturday night events resulted in conflicts with other local IMCA-sanctioned tracks.

Images

References

Motorsport venues in Wisconsin
Buildings and structures in Manitowoc County, Wisconsin
Tourist attractions in Manitowoc County, Wisconsin
Sports venues completed in 1960
1960 establishments in Wisconsin
1990 disestablishments in Wisconsin
1998 establishments in Wisconsin